Sourdough Peak is a 6,201-foot (1,890 meter) mountain summit located at the southern edge of the Wrangell Mountains, in the U.S. state of Alaska. The peak is notable for a rock glacier on its south slope. The peak's name was used by early prospectors as reported in 1908 by the USGS. A "sourdough" is defined as an experienced prospector or an old-timer in the western US or Canada, because they always carried sourdough starter with them. Sourdough Peak's nearest higher neighbor is Porphyry Mountain, 5.1 miles to the northwest.

Climate

Based on the Köppen climate classification, Sourdough Peak is located in a subarctic climate zone with long, cold, snowy winters, and cool summers. Winds coming off the Gulf of Alaska are forced upwards by the Wrangell Mountains (orographic lift), causing heavy precipitation in the form of rainfall and snowfall. Winter temperatures can drop below −20 °C with wind chill factors below −30 °C. The months May through June offer the most favorable weather for viewing and climbing.

See also

List of mountain peaks of Alaska
Geography of Alaska

References

External links
 Weather forecast: Sourdough Peak

Mountains of Alaska
Landforms of Copper River Census Area, Alaska
Wrangell–St. Elias National Park and Preserve
North American 1000 m summits